In enzymology, a cortisone alpha-reductase is an enzyme that catalyzes the chemical reaction

4,5alpha-dihydrocortisone + NADP+  cortisone + NADPH + H+

Thus, the two substrates of this enzyme are 4,5alpha-dihydrocortisone and NADP+, whereas its 3 products are cortisone, NADPH, and H+.

This enzyme belongs to the family of oxidoreductases, specifically those acting on the CH-CH group of donor with NAD+ or NADP+ as acceptor.  The systematic name of this enzyme class is 4,5alpha-dihydrocortisone:NADP+ Delta4-oxidoreductase. Other names in common use include cortisone Delta4-5alpha-reductase, microsomal steroid reductase (5alpha), Delta4-3-ketosteroid reductase (5alpha), Delta4-3-oxosteroid-5alpha-reductase, NADPH:Delta4-3-oxosteroid-5alpha-oxidoreductase, and Delta4-5alpha-reductase.

References

 

EC 1.3.1
NADPH-dependent enzymes
Enzymes of unknown structure